Hedda zu Putlitz (born 4 September 1965) is a German former cyclist. She competed in the women's cross-country mountain biking event at the 2000 Summer Olympics.

References

External links
 

1965 births
Living people
German female cyclists
Olympic cyclists of Germany
Cyclists at the 2000 Summer Olympics
People from Neumünster
German mountain bikers
Cyclists from Schleswig-Holstein